
Restaurant Auguste is a restaurant in Maarssen, Netherlands. It is a fine dining restaurant that was awarded one Michelin star in 2006 and retained that rating until 2008.

In 2013, GaultMillau awarded the restaurant 14 out of 20 points. 

Head chef of Auguste is Giulio Iadarola. Head chef in the period of the Michelin star was Karl van Baggem, later owner and head chef of De Hoefslag.

Auguste was a member of the Alliance Gastronomique Néerlandaise in the period 2007–2008.

See also
List of Michelin starred restaurants in the Netherlands

References 

Restaurants in the Netherlands
Michelin Guide starred restaurants in the Netherlands
Restaurants in Stichtse Vecht